Citrus High School (CHS) is a public high school in the town of Inverness, Florida, United States. A part of the Citrus County School District, Citrus High currently offers a four-year curriculum in grades 9-12 and currently has an enrollment of 1,420 students. Classes start at 7:50 am and dismissal time is at 2:40 pm. The school was founded in 1911 and in 2011 celebrated its 100th anniversary. Citrus High, nicknamed the Hurricanes, was the first of the three high schools in the Citrus County School District, which also includes Crystal River High, in the coastal town of Crystal River and Lecanto High, located in the center of the county. Last year Citrus high was awarded a "B" school grade by the state of Florida, and is currently awaiting news of this year's status.

In the 2016–17 school year, Citrus High School started the Academy of Computer Sciences, an academy designed to give students a strong foundation in computer science. The Academy of Computer Science offers the following classes to accepted students in the program:

Year 1: Digital Information Technology (students learn basic computing and Microsoft Office skills), Programming Essentials (entry level computer programming class, beginning with block-based programming then moving on to Python)
Year 2: AP Computer Science Principles, Web Technologies (web design and design theory) 
Year 3: AP Computer Science A
Year 4: Cybersecurity Fundamentals

Citrus High serves the following communities: Inverness, Floral City, Inverness Highlands North, Inverness Highlands South, and sections of Citrus Hills, Citrus Springs, and Hernando.

History

Citrus High School can be dated back all the way to the late 1800s when it was a wood-frame school building that taught chart class to the sixth grade. It is referred to as the first Inverness High School by some. Citrus High School was officially authorized to be built in 1911 as a two-story brick school house which was designed by architect W.B. Talley. It was to be built on Citrus Avenue. This was across the street from the existing building. The Winston Brothers of Inverness, Florida's bid of $12,760 was approved by the school board. It was built originally to serve high school students, however, after the construction was completed, the school taught grades 1-12.

In 1913, the school was wired for electricity and in 1918, the student body had outgrown the school. The school board originally wished to add on to the school but, after two unsuccessful attempts for bid (no one would bid), the project was abandoned. In 1920, the Board of Public Instruction approved to build a school and principal's home. The newer school was to be built on the corner of Line Avenue and Main Street. The bid was given to C.M. Emerson & Co. for a bid of $19,210. The current old school was to be strictly used as a grammar school. In 1921, the new school was built but was only used for a short time. Due to major structural problems, the students were sent back to the 1911 school. In 1930, a new high school was built once again on Main Street and Line Avenue. Citrus High received accreditation as a four-year high school from the State Board of Education. This school housed students until 1985 when a fire struck Citrus High School which nearly burned down the whole campus. The fire was blamed on faulty wiring. Students were placed in temporary portables to finish the school year. Some classes were held in the original 1911 building which is currently owned by Citrus Memorial Hospital. After the fire, Citrus High School was steadily reconstructed until 1992 when construction on the new East and West Wings were completed. The original building from the 1930 school resides between these wings.

Notable alumni

Sam Franklin - NFL strong safety for the Carolina Panthers, Franklin recorded his first career sack on Patrick Mahomes
Monty Grow – NFL player
Kissy Simmons – Actress, Class of 1993
Rick Hamilton – UCF Athletics Hall of Fame – Football, NFL Player

References

External links
Official website

Educational institutions established in 1913
High schools in Citrus County, Florida
Public high schools in Florida
1913 establishments in Florida